The 1935 Boston College Eagles football team represented Boston College as an independent during the 1935 college football season. The Eagles began the year led by head coach Dinny McNamara, but he resigned after four games due to illness. Former All-American Harry Downes coached the final five games. Boston College played their home games at Alumni Field in Chestnut Hill, Massachusetts. The team finished with a record of 9–3.

Schedule

References

Boston College
Boston College Eagles football seasons
Boston College Eagles football
1930s in Boston